The tenth season of the Australian police-drama Blue Heelers premiered on the Seven Network on 12 February 2003 and aired on Wednesday nights at 8:30 PM. The 42-episode season concluded 26 November 2003.

Casting

Main cast for this season consisted of:
 John Wood as Senior Sergeant Tom Croydon [full season]
 Julie Nihill as Christine 'Chris' Riley [full season]
 Martin Sacks as Senior Detective Patrick Joseph 'P.J.' Hasham [full season]
 Paul Bishop as Senior Constable → Acting Sergeant Benjamin 'Ben' Stewart [full season]
 Jane Allsop as Constable Jo Parrish [full season]
 Caroline Craig as Sergeant Tess Gallagher [until episode 407]
 Ditch Davey as Constable Evan 'Jonesy' Jones [full season]
 Simone McAullay as Constable Susie Raynor [from episode 409]

Guest actors this season included Betty Bobbitt, Robert Grubb, Jeremy Lindsay Taylor, Richard Cawthorne, Lisa Crittenden, Maggie Millar, Betty Lucas, Paul Mercurio, Lynda Gibson, Ian Rawlings, Colette Mann, Ernie Bourne, Lyndel Rowe and Andrew Clarke.

Reception

The show was at an all-time low rating, down from 1.9 million–1.7 million, and the director and producers are thinking about a revamp.

Awards

Episodes

DVD release 
Season 10 Parts 1 and 2 was released on 4 May 2010.

References

General
 Zuk, T. Blue Heelers: 2003 episode guide, Australian Television Information Archive. Retrieved 1 August 2007.
 TV.com editors. Blue Heelers Episode Guide - Season 10, TV.com. Retrieved 1 August 2007.
Specific

Blue Heelers seasons
2003 Australian television seasons